Calyptocephala marginipennis is a species of tortoise beetles in the genus Calyptocephala.

Distribution 
This species can be found in Tropical and subtropical moist broadleaf forests in Mexico.

References 

Cassidinae
Beetles of Central America

Beetles described in 1850